Mikhail Ivanovich Mudrov (1919 — 29 January 1944) was a Soviet fighter pilot and flying ace during World War II. Due to initially being considered missing in action, he was not awarded the title Hero of the Soviet Union despite gaining over 20 solo shootdowns. Eventually, over 50 years after his death, on 10 April 1995, he was posthumously awarded the title Hero of the Russian Federation for his aerial victories.

References 

1919 births
1944 deaths
Soviet World War II flying aces
Heroes of the Russian Federation
Recipients of the Order of the Red Banner
Recipients of the Order of Alexander Nevsky
Missing in action of World War II
Soviet military personnel killed in World War II